"My Honey and Me" is a song by R&B group The Emotions released as a single in 1972 on Stax Records. The single reached No. 18  on the Billboard Hot R&B Singles chart.

Overview
My Honey and Me was produced by Al Jackson Jr. and Jim Stewart. The song was also composed by John McFarland and Luther Ingram. The single's b-side was a song called Blind Alley from The Emotions' 1972 album Untouched.

References

1972 songs
1972 singles
The Emotions songs
Stax Records singles
Songs written by Isaac Hayes